Christian Gailly (14 January 1943 – 4 October 2013) was a French writer.

Biography 
Born in Paris, Gailly first tried to make a career as a jazz saxophonist, then opened a psychoanalyst practice. He began to be published in the 1980s thanks to Jérôme Lindon.

His novel L'Incident was adapted to cinema by Alain Resnais under the title Les Herbes folles in 2009. Un soir au club, winner of the prix du Livre Inter in 2002, which sold 170,000 copies, was adapted by Jean Achache. Nuage rouge, published in 2000, was awarded the prix France Culture. His latest work is a collection of short stories, La roue, et autres nouvelles, published in January 2012.

Themes 
Close to the minimalist mouvement, he was a member of the groupe of the éditions de Minuit to which belonged also among others Jean Echenoz, Jean-Philippe Toussaint and Christian Oster. Rhythmic style and absurd imbroglios are the trademark of his novels. His novels deal mainly with impossible loves, loneliness, sickness and death, but also with other daily tragedies that he tackles in a light tone, sometimes close to gaiety. His writings nevertheless maintain a connection with his love of music, especially jazz, in novels such as Be-Bop and Un soir au club. The influence of American culture, especially cinema, is very present in Les Évadés or Lily et Braine.

His writings often highlight very concrete details which gradually take on great importance, since, according to the author, his stories are sprinkled with "clues, elements, objects, details".

Works 
All the works of Christian Gailly are published at éditions de Minuit.
1987: 
1989: 
1991: 
1992: 
1993: 
1995: 
1996: 
1997: 
1998: 
2000: , Prix France Culture, 2000
2001: , Prix du Livre Inter, 2002
2004: 
2007: 
2010: 
2012:

About the author 
 
 
  
 

The following book gives voice to four translators of Gailly's works:
  Collectif, avec Christian Doumet, Patrick Quillier, Jean-Yves Masson, Robert Davreu, Heinz Schwarzinger, Mike Sens, Claire Jatosti.

References 

1943 births
Writers from Paris
20th-century French novelists
21st-century French novelists
Prix du Livre Inter winners
Prix France Culture winners
2013 deaths